Oakley is a city in Summit County, Utah, United States. It is part of the Salt Lake City, Utah Metropolitan Statistical Area. The population was 1,470 at the 2010 census.

Geography
Scenic route Weber Canyon Road follows the Weber River to its headwaters; it also follows the Smith and Morehouse Creek to its reservoir in its own scenic canyon  from Oakley. The towns of Marion, Kamas, and Peoa are its neighbors, and the Weber River flows nearby.

Climate
This climatic region is typified by large seasonal temperature differences, with warm to hot (and often humid) summers and cold (sometimes severely cold) winters.  According to the Köppen Climate Classification system, Oakley has a humid continental climate, abbreviated "Dfb" on climate maps.

Demographics

In the 2000 census, Oakley had 948 people, 278 households, and 232 families residing within the city. The population density was 150.5 people per square mile  (/km2). There were 330 housing units, with an average density of 52.4 housing units/sq mi  (/km2). The racial makeup of the city was 96.41% White, 0.11% African American, 0.21% Native American, 0.21% Asian, 2.95% from other races, and 0.11% from two or more races. Hispanic or Latino of any race were 4.32% of the population.

Of the 278 households, 48.2% had children under the age of 18; 74.5% were married couples living together; 6.5% had a female as head of household with no husband present; and 16.5% were non-families. Of the city's households, 10.8% were individuals; and 4.3% were persons living alone who were 65 years of age or older. The average household size was 3.41, and the average family size was 3.74.

In the city, 36.8% of the population were under the age of 18; 8.3% from were from 18 to 24; 28.7% were from 25 to 44; 19.9% were from 45 to 64; and 6.2% were 65 or older. The median age was 32. For every 100 females, there were 107.9 males; for every 100 females 18 or over, there were 102.4 males.

The median household income in the 2000 census was $61,250; the median income for a family was $62,059. Males had a median income of $41,250, compared to $30,625 for females. The per capita income for the city was $21,855. About 1.6% of families and 2.3% of the population of the city were below the poverty line, including 2.6% of those under age 18 and none of those age 65 or over.

History 

The valley was inhabited by Ute Indians before the coming of Mormon pioneers.  A historical monument erected in 1939 across the street from the current town hall by the Daughters of the Utah Pioneers, honors the habitation of the Utes.  "INDIAN TRAIL This valley, settled by Thomas Rhoades in 1858, was a summer paradise for Indians who came to hunt, fish and gather wild fruit and sego bulbs. The Weber River Indian Trail skirted the east foothills to Oakley Canyon, crossed the river at the Old Kamas Ford, 3 1/2 miles east of here, running thence to Henry's Fork, and to Brush Creek, in the eastern Uinta Mountains. This trail was used by Indians, Scouts and Pioneers, and is marked in part by roads today."

A Mormon pioneer, Parley P. Pratt, was sent to this valley from Salt Lake City by Brigham Young in 1850 to check on the possibility of establishing settlements along the Weber River and the nearby Provo River. His report was, ". . . a good valley, abundant grass and plenty of water".

The first white man to winter there, in 1853, was Thomas Rhodes. An explorer, trapper, prospector, part-time farmer, and close friend of Brigham Young, he was occasionally called from his California prospecting by Brigham Young when there was a need for money for the church. Rhodes would disappear for a week or so into the Uinta Mountains and return with a supply of gold.

The first settlers in Oakley were William Stevens and wife, Emma Crowden Stevens; they moved there in 1868. Soon to follow were relatives and friends, among them the Fraziers, Johnsons, Hortins, Richards, Wildes and Gibbons, to name a few; all these names are still prominent in the town.

Oakley's original name was "Oak Creek", derived from the name of a creek that ran just east of the present town site and that was thickly overgrown with oak trees. The town changed its name to "Oakley" in late 1886 or early 1887; the new name was chosen from many names submitted by the settlers in a contest.

The current town hall was built as a LDS church in 1903, followed by a schoolhouse in 1904.

Incorporated in 1933 on land originally purchased from the Union Pacific Company by the early settlers in the land sale of the 1880s, Oakley has maintained its small town charm as primarily an agricultural community. At one time, it was a large producer of dairy products. More recently, it has focused on cattle- and horse-feeding, "haying", and still some dairy production. In addition, it is a base for recreational activities, which abound—hiking, fishing, horseback riding, camping, hunting, snowmobiling, and cross-country skiing—all within a very short distance from town.

Memories of early residents can give a real feeling for the town in its early days of the 20th century.  Charles Reed Seymour, son of LDS Bishop John Heber Seymour, wrote the following:

Lifelong resident Ken Woolstenhulme bought the small local grocery store then named The Merc in 1971 and ran it as Ken's Kash until selling it to Larry Devey in 2008.  Then and now, the store is a gathering place for locals looking for the last ingredient for dinner.  Those who grew up locally remember it fondly as one of the last places to offer penny candy. For a time, the store served as the local post office, but increased demand from summer homes up Weber Canyon led the federal government in 1985 to build the present post-office building across the street from the store.  

Ken Woolstenhulme has been involved in all aspects of the town's life, including serving as postmaster, county commissioner, school board member and town mayor at various times in his life.  

In 1998, Mayor Doug Evans and the town of Oakley discovered an underground aquifer containing water that had not seen the surface in at least 18,000 years, according to carbon testing.  Found nearly 1900 feet below the surface in a layer of Mississippian limestone, the water proved among the purest ever tested, free of tritium and any other contamination from the nuclear age.  Requiring little treatment, the water is free of pesticides and herbicides and the town now uses this water from the Humbug Well for its municipal water supply.  Local businessmen have also bought the rights to bottle the water and sell it under different labels.

Local attractions 
Oakley is most famous for its annual rodeo, held each year on the Fourth of July weekend. This rodeo, sanctioned by the Professional Rodeo Cowboys Association, celebrated its 75th anniversary in 2005 with the opening of a $3 million, 6,000-seat arena. A large town park surrounds the rodeo grounds, hosting softball, baseball and soccer tournaments throughout the summer, with Ute League football in the fall and recreational soccer in the spring.  Oakley has two eating establishments, the locally owned Polar King and the Road Island Diner, a former train car made into a restaurant that is on the U.S. National Register of Historic Places.

Education
It is in the South Summit School District.

Oakley School, a boarding school for high school students, was formerly located in Oakley. It closed in 2017.

Notable people
 Actress Katherine Heigl and her husband, country musician Josh Kelley reside on their ranch in Oakley.
 Jake, a famous rescue dog, lived in the city along with owner, Mary Flood.

References

External links
 Oakley City and Rodeo

Cities in Utah
Cities in Summit County, Utah
Populated places established in 1868
Salt Lake City metropolitan area